is a former Japanese football player. He played for Japan national team. His son Shunta Nagai is also a former footballer.

Club career
Nagai was born in Saitama on April 16, 1952. After graduating from high school, he joined Furukawa Electric in 1971. The club won the league champions in 1976 and 1985–86. The club also won 1976 Emperor's Cup, 1977, 1982 and 1986 JSL Cup. He retired in 1988. He played 272 games and scored 63 goals in the league. It is the record for most appearances in Japan Soccer League Division 1. In 1976, he was selected Japanese Footballer of the Year awards. He was selected Best Eleven 5 times.

National team career
On August 13, 1971, when Nagai was 19 years old, he debuted for Japan national team against Iceland. He also played at 1972 Summer Olympics qualification in 1971. Although, he did not play for Japan in 1972, he was selected Japan for 1974 World Cup qualification in 1973. He also played at 1974, 1978 Asian Games. In 1980, he was selected Japan for 1980 Summer Olympics qualification, Japan's failure to qualify for 1980 Summer Olympics. This qualification was his last game for Japan. He played 69 games and scored 9 goals for Japan until 1980.

Coaching career
After retirement, Nagai became a coach for Furukawa Electric (later JEF United Ichihara) in 1988. In 1989, he became a manager for Japan U-20 national team. In 1992, he returned to JEF United Ichihara and managed until 1993. In 1996, he signed with Japan Football League (JFL) club Fukushima FC and managed in 1 season. In 1998, he signed with JFL club Albirex Niigata. The club joined new league J2 League in 1999. In 2001, he moved to Yokohama FC. In 2006, he signed with his local women's league club Urawa Reds Ladies.

In 2012, Nagai was selected Japan Football Hall of Fame.

Club statistics

National team statistics

Managerial statistics

Personal honors
Japanese Footballer of the Year - 1976

References

External links
 
 Japan National Football Team Database

Japan Football Hall of Fame at Japan Football Association

1952 births
Living people
Association football people from Saitama Prefecture
Japanese footballers
Japan international footballers
Japan Soccer League players
JEF United Chiba players
Japanese football managers
J1 League managers
J2 League managers
JEF United Chiba managers
Albirex Niigata managers
Yokohama FC managers
Footballers at the 1974 Asian Games
Footballers at the 1978 Asian Games
Association football forwards
Asian Games competitors for Japan